Caloptilia hercoscelis is a moth of the family Gracillariidae that is known from Fiji.

References

hercoscelis
Moths described in 1939
Endemic fauna of Fiji
Moths of Fiji